Menaka is a Hindu goddess.

Menaka may also refer to:

Geography
Meñaka, a town in Northern Spain
Ménaka, a town in Mali
Menaka Cercle, an administrative subdivision of Mali
Ménaka Region, an administrative region of Mali
Menaka Airport, an airport in Mali

People

Mononym
Menaka (actress) (born 1963), an Indian actress
Madame Menaka (1899–1947), Leila Roy, Lady Sokhey, one of the first non-courtesan Kathak dancers

Given name
Maneka Gandhi (born 1956), an Indian politician
Menaka Guruswamy (born 1974), Indian Supreme Court advocate
Menaka Lalwani, Indian actress
Menaka Rajapakse (born 1983), Sri Lankan actor
Maneka Sardar, Indian politician
Menaka de Silva, (born 1985), Sri Lankan swimmer
Menaka Thakkar (1942–2022), Indo-Canadian dancer, choreographer, and teacher

Surname
Sujani Menaka (born 1980), Sri Lankan actress

Films
Menaka (1935 film), an Indian film
Menaka (1955 film), an Indian film

See also

 Menaca (disambiguation)
 Battle of Menaka (disambiguation)